Andree is an unincorporated community in Stanchfield Township, Isanti County, Minnesota, United States.

Isanti County Road 4 and State Highway 65 (MN 65) are two of the main routes in the community.

Nearby places include Braham, Stanchfield, Coin, Brunswick, and Rice Creek Wildlife Management Area.

Infrastructure

Transportation
  Minnesota State Highway 65
  Isanti County Road 4

References

 Rand McNally Road Atlas – 2007 edition – Minnesota entry

Unincorporated communities in Minnesota
Unincorporated communities in Isanti County, Minnesota